Delhi Metro Rail Corporation Limited (DMRC) is a centre-state joint venture that operates the Delhi Metro. The DMRC is also involved in the planning and implementation of metro rail, monorail, and high-speed rail projects in India and abroad. The work of DMRC is broadly fragmented into various parts which are controlled by the respective directors under the direction of a managing director.

History
The Delhi Metro Rail Corporation Ltd. was created on 3 May 1995 with E. Sreedharan serving as the first managing director. Sreedharan handed over charge as MD of DMRC to Mangu Singh on 31 December 2011.

In 2010 Delhi Metro completed 10 years of operation, which was a major milestone to achieve. To mark its 10th anniversary, Delhi Metro introduced 8 coach train for the first time. A commemorative souvenir book titled "Delhi Metro: A Decade of Dedication, 10 Years of Metro Operations” was also launched. An exclusive 'METRO SONG-zindagi hai Delhi metro' composed by music director Vaibhav Saxena was also released and played at metro stations and FM stations.

DMRC has made it compulsory to wear safety helmets on construction sites. It also earns carbon credits with rainwater harvesting at metro stations and runs an HIV/AIDS programme for workers.

DMRC received Outstanding PSU of the Year (2016) award conferred by All India Management Association (AIMA). DMRC was awarded for its "Outstanding Contribution" for promoting world-class services in Urban Transportation and adopting best practices of Project Management.

Work on other projects

Consultancy
The DMRC has a business development department that is in charge of consultancy services. DMRC has served as the project consultant and has prepared detailed project reports (DPR) for every metro and monorail project in India, except the Kolkata Metro and Chennai MRTS, which were constructed before the formation of the DMRC. The DMRC also provides lighter consultancy operations, such as preparation of DPRs and feasibility reports for proposed systems in places such as Raipur, Amritsar and Nagpur. DMRC also serves as consultant and prepared the DPR for the proposed Thiruvananthapuram - Mangalore High-Speed Passenger Corridor.

In September 2012, DMRC entered into a partnership with eight other international companies for management consulting for the Jakarta Mass Rapid Transit system. This was the DMRC's first project outside India. The DMRC stated that its main responsibilities in the JV were the "finalisation of the organisational structure of the Jakarta Metro, recruitment of personnel, development of training facilities and the training of the employees for various categories required for commencing the operations".

In February 2014, the DMRC was invited by the Government of Kuwait to act as a consultant for the proposed metro system in Kuwait City.

Implementation
The DMRC is involved with the implementation and/or construction of Kochi Metro, Jaipur Metro, Lucknow Metro, Hyderabad Metro and Patna Metro.

Delhi Metro Rail Academy
DMRC trains its staff at the DMRA at Shastri Park, Delhi. It is the only metro rail training institute in South Asia. DMRC has trained 300 staff from Namma Metro, Kochi Metro, Chennai Metro, Rapid Metro Gurgaon and Jaipur Metro, and Noida Metro.  It provides trained staff to new metros on a temporary basis at initial stages.

DMRC in partnership with the Indian Institute of Technology Delhi offers a one-year postgraduate diploma in metro technology. The course produces 25 executives of various streams, viz. Electrical, Civil, Architecture, Signalling, and Telecom, a year to staff metros across India. The Indian Institute of Technology Madras also offers a similar course for the Chennai Metro.

See also
Delhi Metro
National Capital Region Transport Corporation
Rapid transit in India

References

Delhi Metro
Rapid transit companies of India
Railway companies established in 1995
Companies based in Delhi
Indian companies established in 1995